Isaac Newton S/O Philipose is a 2013 Malayalam film directed by V. Bosse, starring Lal, Nedumudi Venu, Tini Tom and Abhinaya.

Cast

References

External links

2010s Malayalam-language films